A hydrogen purifier is a device to purify hydrogen if hydrogen production is done from hydrocarbon sources, the ultra-high purified hydrogen is needed for applications like PEM fuel cells .

Palladium membrane hydrogen purifiers
The palladium membrane is typically a metallic tube of a palladium and silver alloy material possessing the unique property of allowing only monatomic hydrogen to pass through its crystal lattice when it is heated above 300°C.

Dense thin-metal membrane purifier
Dense thin-metal membrane purifiers are compact, relatively inexpensive and simple to use.

Pressure swing adsorption
Pressure swing adsorption is used for the removal of carbon dioxide (CO2) as the final step in the large-scale commercial synthesis of hydrogen. It can also remove methane, carbon monoxide, nitrogen, moisture and in some cases, argon, from hydrogen.

Catalytic recombination or deoxygenation purifier
Catalytic recombination or deoxygenation is used to remove oxygen (O2) impurities. The process is also known as a 'deoxo' process. The oxygen reacts with the hydrogen to form water vapor, which can then be removed by a dryer if necessary. The catalysts that are used are based on platinum group metals (PGM). A typical system could handle up to 3% O2 in H2 in the feed, and reduce the O2 content to less than 1ppm.

Electrochemical purifier 
The electrochemical purifier works similar to a fuel cell, a voltage is applied to the membrane and the resulting electric current pulls hydrogen through the membrane. A well designed system can simultaneously compress the hydrogen.

Applications
Hydrogen purifiers are used in metalorganic vapour phase epitaxy reactors for LED production.

See also
 Gas separation
 Hydrogen pinch
 Membrane gas separation
 Membrane reactor

References

External links
3 industrial hydrogen purifier systems 
Power and Energy, Inc.
Setting a new benchmark for hydrogen delivery

Hydrogen technologies
Chemical equipment
Industrial gases
Gas technologies